Kenya–Russia relations are bilateral relations between Kenya and Russia. Russia had established diplomatic relations with Kenya on December 14, 1963, and has since maintained good relations with the African Great Lakes country.

Overview
During the Cold war, Kenya was part of the Non-aligned movement and thus maintained good relations with the Soviet Union. The Soviet Union even offered Kenyans scholarships to study in the country.

Visits
In October 2019, President Uhuru Kenyatta made a visit to Russia and attended the Russia Africa Summit in Sochi. Kenya and Russia agreed to form a business council which would oversee joint trade and investment programmes.

In November 2010, Russian Foreign Minister Sergey Lavrov visited Nairobi. He had a conversation with the President of Kenya Mwai Kibaki and talks with Acting Foreign Minister George Saitoti. Lavrov was the first Russian Foreign Affairs minister to visit Kenya.

Trade
Bilateral trade reached a total of Kes.35.22 billion (US$340 million).

Kenya exported goods worth Kes.12.85 billion (US$124 million) and Russia exported goods worth Kes.22.37 billion (US$216 million) to Kenya in 2018, according to the Russian Export Centre.

The main goods Russia exports to Kenya are cereals, iron and steel, fertilizers and paper. Kenyan mainly exports cut flowers, coffee, tea, fruits and vegetables to Russia.

Development cooperation
Kenya is annually visited by about 10,000 Russian tourists. To strengthen Russian-Kenyan cooperation agreement in the field of tourism Najib Balala, Kenyan Tourism Minister, visited Moscow in March 2011 to participate in the International Tourism Exhibition.

Transport
In November 2009, the Kenyan delegation led by the Minister of Transport Chirau Ali Mwakwere participated in the First Global Ministerial Conference on Road Safety in Moscow.

In 2010 JSC "Aeroflot - Russian Airlines" and "Kenya Airways' commercial agreement on joint operation of the route Moscow - Dubai - Nairobi, and Aeroflot was scheduled to perform passenger and cargo transportation on the route Moscow - Nairobi - Moscow.

Education
As of 2008, the Russian government and private companies have trained approximately 200 people. In addition, Russia annually grants Kenya 30 scholarships from the federal budget. The number dropped to 26 in 2010, because of organisational difficulties with the Kenyan side.

Diplomatic missions
Russia has an embassy in Nairobi. Additionally, Kenya is represented in Russia through its embassy in Moscow.

See also

Foreign relations of Kenya
Foreign relations of Russia

References

External links
 Documents on the Kenya–Russia relationship from the Russian Ministry of Foreign Affairs
 Embassy of Kenya in Moscow
 Embassy of Russia in Nairobi

 
Africa–Russia relations
Russia
Bilateral relations of Russia